Tullio Lombardo (c. 1455 – November 17, 1532), also known as Tullio Solari, was an Italian Renaissance sculptor. He was the brother of Antonio Lombardo and son of Pietro Lombardo. The Lombardo family worked together to sculpt famous Catholic churches and tombs.  The church of Santi Giovanni e Paolo contains the Monument to Doge Pietro Mocenigo, executed with his father and brother, and the Monument to Doge Andrea Vendramin, an evocation of a Roman triumphal arch encrusted with decorative figures. Tullio also likely completed the funereal monument to Marco Cornaro in the Church of Santi Apostoli and the frieze in the Cornaro Chapel of the Santa Maria Gloriosa dei Frari. He also participated in the work to decorate Santa Maria dei Miracoli, Venice.

References

External links

Sculpture in the Metropolitan MA
On Artcyclopedia
Metropolitan Museum of Art Exhibition, "Tullio Lombardo's Adam: A Masterpiece Restored"

Italian Renaissance sculptors
1460 births
1532 deaths
Republic of Venice artists
15th-century Italian sculptors
Italian male sculptors
16th-century Italian sculptors